The 'Sinukmani Festival' is a festival in Rosario, Batangas, Philippines held every 9 June. Local establishments are the ones who put a long table 462 meters along with the sticky rice pastry sweet caramel topping. Rosario is known as the "Rice Granary of Batangas".

References 

Festivals in the Philippines